Events in the year 1968 in Belgium.

Incumbents
Monarch: Baudouin
Prime Minister: Paul Vanden Boeynants (to 17 July); Gaston Eyskens (from 17 July)

Events

 18 January – Flemish students demonstrate against the French-speaking presence in Leuven
 7 March – Rassemblement wallon founded
 31 March – 1968 Belgian general election
 April – Ronquières inclined plane taken into use
 24 June – Split of the Catholic University of Leuven announced
 7 July – Jacky Ickx wins the 1968 French Grand Prix at Rouen-Les-Essarts

Publications
 Georges Simenon, Maigret hésite

Art and architecture

Buildings
 Sablon Tower completed on the former site of the Maison du Peuple, Brussels

Births
 17 August – Bruno van Pottelsberghe, economist
 – Peter Goes, children's author and illustrator

Deaths
 4 January – Joseph Pholien (born 1884), prime minister
 25 February – Camille Huysmans (born 1871), prime minister
 18 July – Corneille Heymans (born 1892), physiologist, Nobel laureate
 4 December – Louise van den Plas (born 1877), feminist

References

 
1960s in Belgium
Belgium
Years of the 20th century in Belgium
Belgium